Civil Disobedience is the eleventh studio album by Danish electro-industrial musical project Leæther Strip. The limited release of the album included the bonus CD One Nine Eight Two.

Track listing

Disc 1
 Civil Disobedience
 The Damaged People
 When Blood Runs Dark
 Bite Until You Taste Blood
 Jagtvej 69
 Going Nowhere
 I Said I'm Sorry
 Pissing On My Territory
 It Hurts Doesn't It
 One Day
 The Devil's Daughter

Disc 2
 A Whore For Jesus
 I Wear Black On The Inside
 Machineries Of Joy (Die Krupps cover)
 Snakebite
 Soul Collector
 Could Ya, Did Ya
 In The Arms Of A Demon
 One More Reason
 The Cradle Of Death
 Stains
 The Evil In Putin's Eyes

2008 albums
Leæther Strip albums